Choiseul Province is one of the nine provinces of Solomon Islands. It lies southeast of Bougainville (part of Papua New Guinea), west of Santa Isabel Island, and north of Vella la Vella, Kolombangra & New Georgia. It has a population of  36,719 (as of 2020)

The province has three major islands: Choiseul, Wagina, and Rob Roy. 

History

Discovery and naming
When the natives first arrived and discovered the big island, they called it Lauru. Then, in 1568, the Spanish explorer Álvaro de Mendaña de Neira rediscovered the island and named it San Marcos ('Saint Mark'). Mendana himself never set foot on Lauru. He called it San Marcos, because he saw the island from Santa Isabel on the Day of Saint Mark.

200 years later in 1768, the French explorer Louis Antoine de Bougainville saw the island again and named it Choiseul after the Minister of foreign affairs and statesman Choiseul.

Today, the two most common names for the island are Choiseul and Lauru. San Marcos is not commonly used in the present day.

Colonial era
Choiseul Province was initially not part of the British Solomon Islands Protectorate (BSIP). Like Buka, Bougainville (both now part of Papua New Guinea's North Solomons Province), Santa Isabel, and the Ontong Islands, it was part of the German Solomon Islands in 1884. Fifteen years later, in 1899, Germany ceded Choiseul, Isabel and Ontong Java to the British to become part of the British Solomon Islands. In 1900, Charles Woodford, the Resident Commissioner for the Solomon Islands sailed to Choiseul via Isabel on a ship named Torch and planted the British flag on Choiseul on 23 August 1900. Proclaiming Choiseul as part of the British Solomon. During World War II, North West Choiseul, along the Nukiki to Voza corridor was partly occupied by Japanese military forces whose garrison was raided by US marine forces in October and November 1943. The protectorate (BSIP) set up the Choiseul Council in 1948. The council consisted of representatives of the seven sub districts in Choiseul. It met twice a year with the District Commissioner to discuss its business.

Modern era
 logging in Choiseul. Eagon Resource Company Limited is the first logging company to operate in Choiseul when it landed in Moli in 1989.
 25 June 2010- MV.San Marcos, the second ship of Lauru Shipping is commissioned in Taro. San Marcos is a cargo boat of 35 meter, 340 tonne, 250 cubic metres loading capacity and can travel at 10 knots. The vessel was bought from Japan for SB$3.7 million [US$445,000] with funds from the national government SB$1 million [US$12,000], Taiwan Government SB$1 million, Lauru Shipping Company SB$1.6 million [US$193,000] and South Choiseul Constituency SB$100,000 [US$12,000]
 Taro Township. The Choiseul Township Project Office was established in 2008.A short term Land Consultant that has been engaged since 2009 who facilitated the process of acquiring the perpetual estate, parcel 015-002-4 which was purchased under the Sales and Purchase Agreement. Then on 21 December 2011 in the village of Poroporo, The Minister of Provincial Government and Institutional Strengthening, Hon. Walter Folotalu presided over the signing ceremony of the procurement of perpetual estate to the Provincial Government. On that day the Minister handed over a cheque of $4 million as part payment of the purchase price of ten million and forty thousand dollars for a piece of land. The payment was made to the land owners in the mainland.
 First Generator Housefor Taro was built in 2011. It is a diesel generator. It was brought in time for to provide lights for the first Premier's Conference to be held in Choiseul later that year.
Airport upgrade and Terminal Taro airport was upgraded in 2011 with its first terminal in 2011. It was also fenced all around as well. The terminal building was funded by PGSP.
 New Provincial Assembly Hall was built and completed in 2011 with support from the PGSP funding. It was built purposely in time to accommodate the Premiers' Conference in Taro.
 Taro New concrete wharf was built in 2011 to replace the old wooden wharf.
 New Computer Lab for Choiseul Bay Provincial Secondary School was built in 2012. The only Provincial Secondary School in the province.
 In April 2013, the first EFTOS machine was installed by Westpac Bank in the capital Taro as an in store service. Launching the service is Hon.Elijah Doromuala, the parliament member for South Choiseul. However, it not is sustainable, and no longer available.
 During the Choiseul Provincial election that was held in October 2013 history was made when 4 women candidates compete in the election. This is the first time women are competing at the provincial level since Choiseul became a province. None won a seat in the 14 seat Provincial Assembly.
 In 2014 financial year, the Province's annual budget is $15,004,189.00 (SBD) of which $5,729,704.00 is recurrent expenditure and $9,274,485.00 is capital expenditure.

Government

Legislative Authority
On 25 February 1992, a separate Choiseul province was created by separation from the Western Province.

It has had the following Premiers:
1992–1996:   Hon Clement Kengava
1996–2000:   Hon Simmy Vazarabatu
2000–2018:   Hon Jackson Kiloe
2018–(Present): Hon Watson Qoloni

Members to the National Parliament
There are three National Constituencies in Choiseul. However, originally; Choiseul only had 2 constituencies (North & South), as allocated since colonial British. Northwest Choiseul Constituency was created later on; after intensifying political & traditional considerations, and lobbying.

Northeast Choiseul:
 Late Dr. Gideon Zoleveke (Legislative Council - BSIP)
 Late Hon. Allan Qurusu
 Hon. Manasseh Sogavare (1997–present)
Northwest Choiseul:
 Hon. Alpha Kimata (1992-1997)
 Hon. Clement Kengava (1997-2009)
 Hon. Connelly Sandakabatu (2009–2019)
 Hon. Harry Kuma (Present)
South Choiseul:
 Hon. Jason Dorovolomo (Legislative Council - BSIP)
 Hon.Rev Caleb Kotali
 Hon.Rev Leslie Boseto
 Hon. Elijah Doro Muala (2009–2019)
Hon. Robertson Qalokale (2020)
vacant

Mostly, these MPs don't work together well: due to the strong pressure from Kinship Politics, which was strongly influenced by laziness and dependencies by the electorates (enabled by a low literacy, in regard to its total population).

Administrative subdivisions
The Choiseul Province is sub-divided into the following wards:

 Choiseul Province (26,372)
Wagina (1,636)
Katupika (1,988)
Vasipuki (1,574)
Viviru (1,499)
Babatana (1,746)
Tepazaka (1,680)
Batava (4,931)
Tavula (2,487)
Polo (1,719)
Bangera (1,158)
Susuka (1,726)
Senga (1,848)
Kerepangara (1,140)
Kirugela (1,240)

Infrastructure

Health
The Choiseul Provincial Health Service (CPHS) has 26 health facilities around the province. The main referral provincial hospital is the Taro Hospital. The hospital is based on the Taro Island which is also the island capital of the province. It is the first certified Baby Friendly Hospital in the Solomon Islands in October 2010. And awarded the shield by UNICEF and WHO. The award means that Taro Hospital advocates for exclusive breastfeeding for babies up to six months before introduction of soft diet. The hospital also does not encourage artificial and bottle feeding of babies. It also has links to community groups that support, protect and promote the practice of exclusive breast feeding of babies within Taro Hospital catchment area.

The Choiseul Provincial Health Service is also very active in health promotion and education targeting the rural population. It pays emphasis on preventative activities down to the rural areas with the help of community groups, churches and donor partners.

Taro Hospital offers the following primary health programs, reproductive health on ante natal and post natal care, childhealth on immunization, nutrition and breastfeeding practices, non communicable disease, mental health services and malaria program.

Telecommunication
Solomon Telekom Company Limited is the sole provider of both landline and mobile phone communication in the province. Telekom's office is in Taro. Landline phone communication can only be found only on Taro Island. However, Telekom also covers the island with mobile phone towers. Currently, its mobile phone towers are in Pangoe Village, Kagaloga, Sasamuqa and Wagina. In June 2014, Our Telekom added two new mobile towers, one on Ropa Island, in South Choiseul and the second at Ogho village, North West Choiseul.

Two way VHF radio can also be found in the villages, churches, schools and clinics.

Culture

Religion
The first missionaries that came to Choiseul were the Methodists. The first attempt by the Methodist Ministers led by Rev John Goldie was made in 1904, but, was unsuccessful. In 1905, a second attempt was made by Rev Stephen Rabone Rooney, this time on the South of Choiseul at Sasamuqa, which was successful, leading to the first mission established in Sasamuqa village in 1905.
The missionaries were instrumental in the introduction of education and health to the population. The three denominations involved in Missionary work in Choiseul were the Methodists, Catholics and the Seventh Day Adventists."

Deaconess Iula Qilanoba, the first Methodist deaconess from the Solomon Islands, was a native of Choiseul Province.

People
The people consists of several Melanesian tribes including the Gilbertese who live on Wagina. In the 19th century head hunting and blackbirding were widespread in the Solomon Islands. This led to the extinction of the people on Wagina in the 1870s. Even in the 20th century the Choiseul islanders were ill-reputed as brutal cannibals so that visitors only came with armed forces to that island. In 1916 there were brutal feuds between the several tribes which were ended by the peace treaty of Sasamungga on 8 August 1921. This event, called Kulabule, is a holiday on Choiseul.

Music
Traditionally, people in Choiseul use bamboos for traditional flutes. Now these traditional music is only performed in custom ceremonies. 
One of the string bands from Choiseul was the Sirovanga Boys. Their best known song being "seni memory."
Another group from Choiseul in the early 2000s was the band Savoto. Their hit songs include "inaka mach" and "Ke siro."

Football
The inhabitants of Choiseul are soccer enthusiasts. They have a team called Lauru Kuvojo, which in 2005 took part at the Solomon-Cup, the national football championship of the Solomon Islands. They have finished their participation already in the preliminary round. In November 2012 the bi-annual Kuvojo Cup was held with a team representing the provincial capital Taro winning against a team from Senga ward. Most of the 14 wards throughout Choiseul sent representative teams to participate at the Kuvojo Cup tournament in both soccer and netball.

Geography and environment

Flora and fauna
The flora and fauna are both characteristic of Australia and New Guinea. The biggest mammal is the endangered dugong, a seacow which occurs in the waters near Rob Roy and Taro Island. The largest reptile is the saltwater crocodile (Crocodylus porosus) known from Australia. Known birds are the Sanford's fish eagle (Haliaeetus sanfordi), the Pacific black duck (Anas superciliosa), and the eastern reef egret (Egretta sacra). Until the beginning of the 20th century, it was the only habitat of the now extinct Choiseul crested pigeon (Microgoura meeki). Choiseul is also an important breeding place for the loggerhead sea turtle (Caretta caretta). The flora is represented by mangroves and coconuts.

Environmental issues

Commercial logging continues to operate in Choiseul throughout the entire province. A nickel mine is being planned in Katupika at the Choiseul mine and will see over  cleared to gain access to nickel deposits over the life of the mining  operation, although no mining license has been issued as of 2020. Prospecting for gold has also occurred close to Susuka in north Choiseul.

Islands
 Bembalama
 Choiseul
 Cyprian Bridge
 Kaghau
 Laena
 Nanagho
 Nuatambu
 Rob Roy
 Saerema
 Taro
 Moli Island
 Zinoa Islands
 Supizae Island
 Parama Island
 Butuburu Island
 Kundakaniboko Island
 Wagina

References

Reference bibliography

External links
 Information about Choiseul (engl.)
 History of Choiseul (engl.)
 WorldStatesmen- Solomon Islands & includes flag
 Exploring Solomons - Choiseul page

Provinces of the Solomon Islands
 
States and territories established in 1995